The 1997–98 Eastern Counties Football League season was the 56th in the history of Eastern Counties Football League a football competition in England.

Premier Division

The Premier Division featured 19 clubs which competed in the division last season, along with three new clubs:
Ely City, promoted from Division One
Histon, promoted from Division One
Sudbury Town, resigned from the Southern Football League and replaced reserve team

League table

Division One

Division One featured 16 clubs which competed in the division last season, along with two new clubs, relegated from the Premier Division:
Hadleigh United
March Town United

League table

References

External links
 Eastern Counties Football League

1997-98
1997–98 in English football leagues